Mikel Spaho (born 30 August 1982 in Lushnjë) is an Albanian footballer who most recently played as a goalkeeper for Lushnja in the Albanian First Division.

External links
 
 Profile - FSHF

1982 births
Living people
Sportspeople from Lushnjë
Albanian footballers
Association football goalkeepers
KS Lushnja players
Flamurtari Vlorë players
Kategoria Superiore players
Kategoria e Parë players